NGC 1160 is a spiral galaxy approximately 116 million light-years away from Earth in the constellation of Perseus. It was discovered, along with NGC 1161, by English astronomer William Herschel on October 7, 1784.

NGC 1160 forms a visual pair with the galaxy NGC 1161. Both galaxies are located between the Local and Perseus superclusters.

See also 
 Spiral galaxy 
 List of NGC objects (1001–2000)
 Perseus (constellation)

References

External links 
 
 
 SEDS

Spiral galaxies
Perseus (constellation)
1160
11403
Astronomical objects discovered in 1784
Discoveries by John Herschel